Tricine is an organic compound that is used in buffer solutions. The name tricine comes from tris and glycine, from which it was derived. It is a white crystalline powder that is moderately soluble in water. It is a zwitterionic amino acid that has a pKa1 value of 2.3 at 25 °C, while its pKa2 at 20 °C is 8.15. Its useful buffering range of pH is 7.4-8.8. Along with bicine, it is one of Good's buffering agents.  Good first prepared tricine to buffer chloroplast reactions.

Applications
Tricine is a commonly used electrophoresis buffer and is also used in resuspension of cell pellets.  It has a higher negative (more negative) charge than glycine allowing it to migrate faster.  In addition its high ionic strength causes more ion movement and less protein movement.  This allows for low molecular weight proteins to be separated in lower percent acrylamide gels.  Tricine has been documented in the separation of proteins in the range of 1 to 100 kDa by electrophoresis.  The tricine buffer at 25 mmol/L was found to be the most effective buffer among the ten tested for ATP assays using firefly luciferase.  Tricine has also been found to be an effective scavenger of hydroxyl radicals in a study of radiation-induced membrane damage.

See also
 SDS-PAGE
 Ampholyte
 Glycine
 Bicine

References

Triols
Buffer solutions
Amino acid derivatives
Zwitterions